Mary Fuzesi (last name pronounced "foo-zay-zee") was born February 21, 1974, in Budapest. She is a retired female gymnast from Canada, who was born in Hungary. She competed for Canada in the rhythmic gymnastics competition at the 1988 Summer Olympics. She won a total number of  four medals at the 1987 Pan American games, six medals at the 1991 Pan American Games in Havana, Cuba, and five at the 1990 Commonwealth Games in Auckland, New Zealand.

References
sports-reference

1974 births
Living people
Canadian rhythmic gymnasts
Gymnasts at the 1988 Summer Olympics
Gymnasts at the 1990 Commonwealth Games
Gymnasts at the 1991 Pan American Games
Commonwealth Games gold medallists for Canada
Commonwealth Games silver medallists for Canada
Commonwealth Games bronze medallists for Canada
Olympic gymnasts of Canada
Sportspeople from Budapest
Hungarian emigrants to Canada
Pan American Games gold medalists for Canada
Pan American Games silver medalists for Canada
Pan American Games bronze medalists for Canada
Commonwealth Games medallists in gymnastics
Pan American Games medalists in gymnastics
Medalists at the 1991 Pan American Games
20th-century Canadian women
Medallists at the 1990 Commonwealth Games